Chocolate mint may refer to:
 Mint chocolate (flavoured chocolate)
 Mint chocolate chip
 Chocolate Mint (plant)